Freccia means Arrow in Italian and may refer to:
Italian Armoured Division Freccia, of the Italian army in World War II.
Fiat G.50 Freccia, an Italian fighter aircraft of World War II.
Freccia class destroyers, of the Italian navy.
Freccia, a wheeled Italian Infantry Fighting Vehicle.
Le Frecce, high-speed trains operated by Trenitalia in Italy.

See also:
Alfa Romeo, an Italian automobile known as La freccia rossa (The red arrow)
Pietro Mennea, an Italian sprinter known as Freccia del Sud (Arrow of the South).